The following is a list of Dayton Flyers men's basketball head coaches. There have been 20 head coaches of the Flyers in their 118-season history.

Dayton's current head coach is Anthony Grant. He was hired as the Flyers' head coach in March 2017, replacing Archie Miller, who left to become the head coach at Indiana.

References

Dayton

Dayton Flyers men's basketball coaches